Juan Aurich is the name of several football clubs from Chiclayo, Peru.

Club Deportivo Juan Aurich, founded in 1922 and last played in the Primera División in 1991
Aurich–Cañaña, the result of the fusion of the traditional clubs Juan Aurich (1922–1992) and Deportivo Cañaña, existed between 1993 and 1996.
Juan Aurich de Chiclayo, founded in 1996 and played in the first division between 1998 and 2002
Juan Aurich de La Victoria, founded in 2005 following the dissolution of Juan Aurich de Chiclayo and currently plays in the second division